Veronica brownii is a plant belonging to the family Plantaginaceae native to New South Wales in Australia, where it is restricted to the Blue Mountains. It has arching branches with variable shaped leaves and lilac flowers in spring and summer.

Description
The stems occasionally arise from a leaf or branch node. Flowers from spring to summer.

Taxonomy and naming
Veronica brownii was first formally described in 1817 by Johann Jacob Roemer and Josef August Schultes and the description was published in Systema Vegetabilium.

Distribution and habitat
This species is endemic to New South Wales and grows in eucalyptus forest in valleys of the Blue Mountains at generally altitudes from  metres.

References

Flora of New South Wales
brownii
Plants described in 1817